Fioletovka may refer to:
Fioletovka, Bilasuvar, Azerbaijan
Fioletovka, Fizuli, Azerbaijan